Aachener Printen are a type of Lebkuchen originating from the city of Aachen in Germany. Somewhat similar to gingerbread, they were originally sweetened with honey, but are now generally sweetened with a syrup made from sugar beets.

The term is a protected geographical indication, meaning that all manufacturers must be located in or near Aachen.

History
The first pastries of this kind most likely originated from the city of Dinant in nearby Belgium. The city has produced pastries with engraved pictures (couques de Dinant) for over a thousand years. Copper producing (another specialty of Dinant) craftsmen who emigrated to Aachen in the 15th century probably brought the recipe, concept and tradition of engraved pastries with them to Aachen. Originally, the Printen were sold by Aachen's pharmacists since some of their ingredients (honey, several herbs and spices) were considered to possess medical benefits.

Production

Originally sweetened with honey, nowadays Aachener Printen are sweetened with the syrup from sugar beets as honey became temporarily unavailable when Napoleon issued a trade embargo, banning all trade with the main supplier of honey, the United States. The tradition of sweetening with sugar beets was kept even after Napoleon was defeated and the French occupation lifted.

Printen are made from a variety of ingredients including cinnamon, aniseed, clove, cardamom, coriander, allspice and also ginger. The exact mixture of these ingredients, however, is a close kept secret of the individual Printen bakeries.

Additionally to the original Printen, there are also Printen with nuts (usually almonds), covered in chocolate or glaze and marzipan.

See also
 List of German desserts

References

External links

 Aachener Printen
 Aachener printen 
 Aachener printen

Biscuits
German cuisine
German pastries
German products with protected designation of origin
Anise